Louis Sidney Britton (born 17 March 2001) is an English footballer who plays as a forward for Marine on dual registration with Chorley.

Career
Originally starting out with AEK Boco and then Bath City, Britton had spells with Cadbury Heath and Brislington before making the move to Mangotsfield United ahead of the 2018–19 campaign. After a successful debut season, he transferred to Bristol City on 18 April 2019. He returned to Bath City on loan for the 2019–20 season. In the 2020-21 season, he had brief loans at Torquay United, and Stockport County before returning to Bristol City. he had Britton made his professional debut with Bristol City in a 3–1 EFL Championship loss to Brentford on 8 May 2021; coming on as a late sub in the 72nd minute, Britton scored his side's only goal in the 87th minute on his debut.

On 2 December 2021, Britton returned to the National League to join mid-table, Woking on a months loan. 

On 1 February 2022, Britton signed for League of Ireland First Division club Waterford on loan until the end of June.

On 4 May 2022, it was announced that Britton would leave Bristol City at the end of his contract in June.

On 29 June 2022, Britton signed for Cork City on a permanent basis following his release from Bristol City, after impressing during his loan spell at rivals Waterford, for whom he scored 10 goals in 17 games. Britton was on the receiving end of abusive messages and threats from Waterford fans on social media following the move to their rivals.

On 11 November 2022, Britton signed for National League side Yeovil Town on a free transfer. On 6 January 2023, Britton left Yeovil via mutual consent having played four times, scoring once.

On 8 January 2023, Britton signed for National League North side Chorley. He signed for Marine on dual registration on 16th January 2023.

Personal life
Britton's father, Geoff Britton, was a semi-pro footballer in non-league teams in England. Britton apprenticed as a painter before signing his professional contract with Bristol City. He is a childhood fan of Manchester City.

Career statistics

References

External links
 

2001 births
Living people
Footballers from Bristol
English footballers
Association football forwards
Bath City F.C. players
Cadbury Heath F.C. players
Brislington F.C. players
Mangotsfield United F.C. players
Bristol City F.C. players
Yate Town F.C. players
Torquay United F.C. players
Stockport County F.C. players
Woking F.C. players
Waterford F.C. players
Cork City F.C. players
Yeovil Town F.C. players
Chorley F.C. players
League of Ireland players
Expatriate association footballers in the Republic of Ireland
English Football League players
National League (English football) players
Southern Football League players